Lawrence Adam Michael Abrahams (born 3 April 1953) is an English retired professional footballer who played as a striker in England, the United States, and Australia. In a career which lasted from 1977 to 1987, Abrahams played 283 career league games, and scored 142 league goals.

Career

Playing career
Abrahams was born in Stepney, in the East End of London. His family moved to Alfold in Surrey and he started his football career in the youth team at Alfold F.C., once scoring 101 goals in a single season) He returned to London and joined non-league club Barking, also working in a tailor's shop. He signed a professional contract in 1977 with Charlton Athletic. He spent one season at Charlton, making sixteen appearances. After leaving Charlton in 1978, Abrahams moved to the United States and played in the North American Soccer League for the New England Tea Men, Tulsa Roughnecks, and California Surf. The Surf folded at the end of the 1981 season and on 6 October 1981, the Tulsa Roughnecks selected Abrahams in the Dispersal Draft. He played the 1982 and 1983 outdoor seasons in Tulsa followed by the 1983–1984 NASL indoor season. He was the Offensive MVP of 1983 NASL Grand Prix of Indoor Soccer, posting 12 goals and 6 assists in 8 games. In May 1984, the Roughnecks traded Abrahams to the San Diego Sockers in exchange for Peter Skouras and two used soccer balls. He began the season paired with Ade Coker up front, but was relegated to the bench after the Sockers acquired Steve Zungul and Branko Segota. On 17 October 1984, the Sockers sold Abrahams's rights to the New York Cosmos for $25,000. The Cosmos entered the Major Indoor Soccer League in the fall of 1984, but sold his contract to the Kansas City Comets in January 1985. He remained with the Comets through the 1985–1986 season. Abrahams spent the 1986 season in Australia with the Melbourne Knights, where he made 9 appearances, before returning to America to play with the Wichita Wings during the 1986–1987 MISL season.

Coaching career
Abrahams is currently the Assistant Soccer Coach at Irvine Valley College.

References

External links
 NASL/MISL career stats
 Aussie Footballers Abbas to Alberton

1953 births
Living people
Alfold F.C. players
Barking F.C. players
California Surf players
Charlton Athletic F.C. players
English expatriate footballers
English expatriate sportspeople in Australia
English expatriate sportspeople in the United States
English footballers
Expatriate soccer players in Australia
Expatriate soccer players in the United States
Association football forwards
Kansas City Comets (original MISL) players
Major Indoor Soccer League (1978–1992) players
Melbourne Knights FC players
North American Soccer League (1968–1984) indoor players
New England Tea Men players
New York Cosmos (MISL) players
North American Soccer League (1968–1984) players
National Soccer League (Australia) players
Footballers from Stepney
San Diego Sockers (NASL) players
Tulsa Roughnecks (1978–1984) players
Wichita Wings (MISL) players